Tin Matić (born 23 October 1997) is a Croatian professional footballer who plays for Celje as a forward.

Club career
Matić made his professional Fortuna Liga debut for Zemplín Michalovce against AS Trenčín on 19 August 2017.

References

External links
 
 
 Futbalnet profile

1997 births
Living people
Footballers from Zagreb
Association football forwards
Croatian footballers
Croatia youth international footballers
GNK Dinamo Zagreb II players
Legia Warsaw II players
Zagłębie Sosnowiec players
MFK Zemplín Michalovce players
NK Zadar players
NK Hrvatski Dragovoljac players
NK Triglav Kranj players
NK Celje players
First Football League (Croatia) players
I liga players
Slovak Super Liga players
Slovenian Second League players
Slovenian PrvaLiga players
Croatian expatriate footballers
Expatriate footballers in Poland
Expatriate footballers in Slovakia
Expatriate footballers in Slovenia
Croatian expatriate sportspeople in Poland
Croatian expatriate sportspeople in Slovakia
Croatian expatriate sportspeople in Slovenia